Alberto Malesani (born 5 June 1954) is an Italian football manager and former player. As a manager, he is mostly remembered for his successful spell with Parma during the late 1990s, where he won the Coppa Italia, the UEFA Cup, and the Supercoppa Italiana.

Career

Early career and breakthrough at Chievo
Malesani career as player was mostly spent on a Veronese amateur team Audace S. Michele, where he obtained a promotion from Serie D to Serie C in 1976–77, appearing fourteen times on that season. He retired from playing football at the age of 24, and worked at Canon in Amsterdam, where he studied the Ajax Amsterdam total football training methods. His passion for coaching was so great, that on his honeymoon, he decided to go to Barcelona in order to watch Johan Cruijff's coaching sessions at Barcelona FC.
 
Malesani left his job at Canon in 1990 order to pursue a coaching career at Serie C1 team Chievo for the Allievi youth squad. In 1991, he is assistant of head coach Carlo De Angelis in the first team, and in 1993 he becomes head coach himself. His first season as head coach ended in a historical promotion to Serie B for then-unknown Chievo.

Fiorentina, Parma and UEFA Cup triumph
Malesani left Chievo in 1997, after three impressive Serie B seasons and a narrowly missed promotion in the Serie A league in order to become Fiorentina's boss, in what was his first stint in the Italian top flight.

A good Fiorentina season convinced Parma to appoint Malesani as new head coach in 1998, where he won a Coppa Italia, a UEFA Cup, an Italian Super Cup and obtained two fourth places before being sacked during the 2000–01 season.

From Verona to Panathinaikos and Udinese
After losing his job at Parma, Malesani then coached Verona and Modena, failing to save the clubs from relegation in both cases; successively he moved abroad to coach Greek side Panathinaikos. Panathinaikos remains the club with the highest percentage of wins in Malesani's career to date (60%).

Malesani was appointed coach of Udinese in January 2007, as replacement for Giovanni Galeone. He led his side to a not particularly impressive tenth place in the 2006–07 Serie A final table, only seven points far from relegation, being not confirmed for the following season. On 27 November 2007 he was unveiled as Empoli's new head coach, replacing Luigi Cagni. He was axed on 31 March 2008 following a 2–0 home defeat to U.C. Sampdoria which left Empoli down in last place in the league table.

From Siena to Bologna
On 23 November 2009, he was appointed as the new head coach of Siena, replacing Marco Baroni. On 21 May 2010, was released by Siena.

On 1 September 2010, he signed a one-year contract for Bologna.
After a successful season which saw his club finish in 16th place, six points clear of relegation, despite a three-point deduction for tax problems and running feuds over the club's ownership, Malesani was replaced by Pierpaolo Bisoli on 26 May 2011.

Genoa
On 19 June 2011, Genoa officially announced that Malesani would be the new first team head coach. However, after Genoa was defeated 6-1 by Napoli, Malesani was fired. He returned to Genoa on 2 April 2012, taking over from Pasquale Marino who had previously replaced him only to be sacked a few months later. His second stint as Genoa boss lasted however only twenty days, as he was sacked once again on 22 April after a 1–4 home loss to Siena that left Genoa one point shy of relegation, and led to massive protests from Genoa fans during the game.

Palermo
On 5 February 2013, Malesani was appointed as the manager of Palermo.

However, after three matches in charge, on 24 February 2013 Malesani was relieved from his duties as the manager.

Sassuolo
On 29 January 2014, it was announced Malesani had agreed to take over as new manager of Serie A team Sassuolo.

Controversy

Hellas Verona
On 18 November 2001, after winning the first historical Serie A derby between Hellas Verona F.C. and Chievo Verona with the result of 3–2, Malesani wildly ran and celebrated in front of the tiers reserved to Verona supporters, even getting on his knees. His behaviour was criticized, but Malesani fought back during Monica Vanali's post-match interview, arguing about his colleagues using stock phrases, claiming his managerial wins and defending his conduct, which he had anticipated to the opponent's manager Gigi Delneri.

Panathinaikos
On 16 December 2005, after a disappointing 2–2 draw against Iraklis, Malesani held a roaring press conference. Tired of the criticisms he and Panathinaikos had received for some poor performances both from press and supporters, he defended his hard work and dedication, as well as the club's owner Giannis Vardinogiannis, in front of the journalists.

Siena
On 9 January 2010, after losing 4-3 a dramatic match at San Siro stadium against the Inter team which went on winning the treble, Malesani contested the foul leading to the free-kick Inter scored for the temporary 3-3. In particular, Malesani claimed that small teams have no protection in Serie A and big teams take advantage of that.

On 24 January 2010, after a 1–1 home draw against Cagliari, Siena President Massimo Mezzaroma declared his disappointment for the team performances in front of TV journalists. Following this statement, RAI host Enrico Varriale welcomed Malesani in the post-match interview calling him "allenatore che sta un po' sulla graticola" (Italian for "manager risking his job") and anticipated that Mezzaroma would have phoned him later. Malesani was left surprised and deeply embittered, especially because the discussion had immediately focused on off-the-pitch topics. He then reminded that Mezzaroma had said good things about him and that he was doing everything he could for the team, underlining the upsides of the draw.

Genoa
On 1 December 2011, Malesani got very annoyed by the journalists calling him "mollo" (Italian for "limp"). Consequently, he focused his press conference on proving his motivation and skills.

Managerial statistics

Honours

Managerial
Chievo (1993–1997)
Serie C1: 1993–94

Parma (1998–2001)
Coppa Italia: 1998–99
UEFA Cup: 1998–99
Supercoppa Italiana: 1999

See also
List of UEFA Cup winning managers

References

External links

Profile of Alberto Malesani on Hellastory.net

1954 births
Living people
Footballers from Verona
Association football midfielders
UEFA Cup winning managers
Udinese Calcio managers
Parma Calcio 1913 managers
ACF Fiorentina managers
Modena F.C. managers
Panathinaikos F.C. managers
A.C. ChievoVerona managers
Empoli F.C. managers
A.C.N. Siena 1904 managers
Bologna F.C. 1909 managers
Genoa C.F.C. managers
Italian football managers
L.R. Vicenza players
Super League Greece managers
Palermo F.C. managers
U.S. Sassuolo Calcio managers
Serie A managers
Expatriate football managers in Greece
Italian footballers